Kévin Estre (born 28 October 1988) is a French professional racing driver. He is currently competing in the FIA World Endurance Championship for Porsche in the GTE PRO class.

Early career

Karting
Born in Lyon, Estre began his racing career in karting, contesting the 2001 French Cadet Championship and taking his first title. In 2004, he won the European ICA Championship, beating Jon Lancaster in the title competition.

Formula Renault
In 2006, Estre began his graduation to single-seater racing by running in Formula Campus by Renault and Elf which he won comfortably at the first attempt, taking six wins and a total of twelve podium finishes from thirteen races.

For the 2007 season, Estre graduated into the French Formula Renault 2.0 championship for Graff Racing. He finished ninth, taking nine point-scoring finishes from thirteen races.

Sportscar career 
Estre decided to switch to sportscars in 2008, continuing his collaboration with Graff Racing into the Porsche Carrera Cup France. He won a race at the final round of the season at Magny-Cours and scored another three podiums, finishing fifth overall.

He remained in the series for 2009, but switched to Sofrev — ASP. This time he added race victories at Nogaro, Le Castellet and Circuit de Lédenon, improving to fourth position in the series standings. As well as this, Estre competed in the Le Castellet round of the 2009 FIA GT3 European Championship season with MP Racing.

In 2010, he continued his participation in the Porsche Carrera Cup France with Sofrev — ASP. He again scored five wins, with a total of twelve podium finishes. This allowed him to enter the title battle with Frédéric Makowiecki, but Estre finished the season as runner-up to Makowiecki, by two points. Estre also raced with Mühlner Motorsport in the opening two rounds of the 2010 FIA GT3 European Championship season and the season-opening Oschersleben round of the 2010 ADAC GT Masters season.

In 2011, Estre remained in the Porsche Carrera Cup France for a fourth successive year, but he joined the AS Events team. He dominated the season, amassing ten wins and took the championship title with an eventual margin of 113 points over his closest championship rival, Sylvain Noël. Additionally he made his début in both the Porsche Supercup and the Porsche Carrera Cup Germany with Attempto Racing. In the Supercup he raced on a full-time basis, finishing seventh with a win at Monza. In the German series, he only competed at the Norisring.

For 2012, Estre decided to concentrate on the Supercup and the German series, continuing with Attempto Racing. In the Supercup, he finished as runner-up to René Rast, with one win at the Hungaroring. In the German series, he finished fourth, winning the 24 Hours Nürburgring support race held on the Nordschleife. He qualified on pole position for the 24 Hours with a laptime of 8:10.9, averaging 186.1 km/h.

Estre also had a part-time schedule in the French series, contesting five races with Nourry Competition.

In 2013, he prolonged his collaboration with Attempto Racing in the Supercup and German series. He scored three podium finishes to end the season fourth in the Supercup, while in the German series, he dominated from the start of the season, collecting eight race wins in seventeen races to take the championship title.

In 2014, Estre became a McLaren GT factory driver, joining the ART Grand Prix squad in the Blancpain Endurance Series. He competed in the No. 99 McLaren MP4-12C GT3 with Kevin Korjus and Andy Soucek. The crew achieved two podiums, finishing the season in eighth position in the Pro Cup standings.

In 2015, Estre joined Chris Cumming and Laurens Vanthoor in OAK Racing in the LMP2 class of the 24 Hours of Le Mans. Also, he will stay in the Blancpain Endurance Series, but will switch to Von Ryan Racing. He will race in the No. 58 McLaren 650S GT3 with Rob Bell and Shane van Gisbergen. He also competes for McLaren at the Blancpain Sprint Series for Attempto Racing, partnering with Bell.

In addition, the Frenchman competed at the Pirelli World Challenge, where he drove a K-Pax Racing McLaren to fifth place in the GT drivers standings. Also, he drove a Porsche 911 GT America at the 24 Hours of Daytona for Park Place Motorsports, and competed for the Porsche factory team at the 6 Hours of Spa-Francorchamps on a Porsche 911 RSR.

Hypercar career
Estre would move to the Porsche Penske Motorsport Hypercar programme for the 2023 season of the World Endurance Championship, competing alongside André Lotterer and Laurens Vanthoor in a Porsche 963.

Racing record

Career summary

† Estre was a guest driver, therefore ineligible to score points.

Complete Porsche Supercup results
(key) (Races in bold indicate pole position) (Races in italics indicate fastest lap)

Complete IMSA SportsCar Championship results

† Full points not awarded due to exceeding maximum drive time limitation.

Complete FIA World Endurance Championship results

Complete 24 Hours of Le Mans results

References

External links
 
 

1988 births
Living people
Sportspeople from Lyon
French racing drivers
French Formula Renault 2.0 drivers
Porsche Supercup drivers
ADAC GT Masters drivers
International GT Open drivers
Blancpain Endurance Series drivers
American Le Mans Series drivers
Rolex Sports Car Series drivers
WeatherTech SportsCar Championship drivers
24 Hours of Daytona drivers
24 Hours of Le Mans drivers
24 Hours of Spa drivers
FIA World Endurance Championship drivers
Porsche Motorsports drivers
ART Grand Prix drivers
NASCAR drivers
Nürburgring 24 Hours drivers
Graff Racing drivers
OAK Racing drivers
Formule Campus Renault Elf drivers
KCMG drivers
La Filière drivers
Boutsen Ginion Racing drivers
Craft-Bamboo Racing drivers
Porsche Carrera Cup Germany drivers
Team Penske drivers